Victory Road, known as  in Japan, is a run and gun video game released by SNK for arcades in 1986. It is the sequel to Ikari Warriors.

The objective is to defeat the enemy aliens using grenades and other weapons. The story directly picks up at the ending of Ikari Warriors. Congratulated by General Kawasaki for rescuing him, Paul and Vince return home to their native country in a plane arranged by the general. A mysterious storm appears and they are hurtled thousands of years into the future. They are met by an alien creature who says that the villain Zang Zip has taken over the land.

Gameplay
The original arcade game featured an 8-way rotary joystick that could be twisted in place to rotate the onscreen character allowing the player to face in one of eight directions while moving in another.

It features sampled voiceovers from the main characters and the game's bosses.

The NES version includes the added feature of collecting "zeny" as currency, which is used to buy improved weaponry and armor. The NES version emulates the controls of the arcade version by locking the facing of the character in one direction for as long as the "fire" button is depressed. Weapons no longer have limited ammunition. The player character begins with a flamethrower but, when the player loses a life, it is changed to a machine gun.

Weapon powerups are scattered throughout the levels, often hidden under rocks destroyable by the bazooka weapon or grenades.

There are no vehicles in this game, but it was replaced by armour, which allows player to take a limited number of hits without time expiration.

The game reuses the single-stage design from its predecessor, but added mini-stages where players fight a boss when entered through the green door.

Reception
In Japan, Game Machine listed Victory Road on their December 1, 1986 issue as being the third most-successful table arcade unit of the month.

The Spanish magazine Microhobby reviewed the ZX Spectrum version of the game with the following scores: Originality: 20%; Graphics: 70%; Motion: 70%; Sound: 70%; Difficulty: 90%; Addiction: 80%.

Sequel
This was followed up with the sequel Ikari III: The Rescue, released in 1989.

References

External links
Arcade history page
Ikari II Dogosoken walkthrough

1986 video games
1989 video games
1990 video games
Amiga games
Arcade video games
Nintendo Entertainment System games
SNK games
SNK Playmore games
Run and gun games
ZX Spectrum games
Amstrad CPC games
Apple II games
Commodore 64 games
Nintendo Switch games
PlayStation Network games
PlayStation 4 games
Video games scored by Fred Gray
Video games developed in Japan
Hamster Corporation games